Auburn Lull is an American five-piece dream pop band from Lansing, Michigan, United States, which formed in 1994.

Biography
The band was founded in 1994 by guitarist/vocalist Sean Heenan, guitarists Jason Kolb and Eli Wekenman, and drummer Jason Wiesinger. The quintet came together out of its members' shared affection for bands like Seefeel, Flying Saucer Attack, earlier works from Orchestral Manoeuvres in the Dark, along with many of the acts on the 4AD and Creation Records imprints. They later added bassist/guitarist Ron Gibbs.

In 1997, the Dearborn, Michigan label Burnt Hair Records released the Dual Group EP — a split recording with Auburn Lull and Mahogany. Auburn Lull's full-length debut, Alone I Admire, initially released on Burnt Hair in 1999, was later reissued by Darla Records in 2002. Belgian label Zeal Records released a limited-edition 2001 7" single, "Behind All Curses of Thought Lies the Ability to Focus on Vacant Spaces". Auburn Lull's second album, Cast from the Platform, was released in 2004. A rarities compilation, Regions Less Parallel, was issued in 2005, followed by their third album, Begin Civil Twilight, in 2008. The band released their fourth album, Hypha, on September 15, 2017 on the Azure Vista label.

Discography

Studio albums
Alone I Admire (1999, Burnt Hair; 2002, Darla)
Cast from the Platform (2004, Darla)
Begin Civil Twilight (2008, Darla)
Hypha (2017, Azure Vista)

EPs
Dual Group split with Mahogany (1997, Burnt Hair)
Hiber (2014, Geographic North)

Compilation albums
Regions Less Parallel: Early Works and Rarities 1996–2004 (2005, Darla)

References

External links 
Official site

Rock music groups from Michigan
Dream pop musical groups
American shoegaze musical groups
American space rock musical groups
American post-rock groups
Darla Records artists